Martijn Verschoor (born 4 May 1985) is a Dutch former professional road racing cyclist, who competed for  between 2010 and 2017. At the age of thirteen, Verschoor was diagnosed with type 1 diabetes. A graduate of Hanze University, Verschoor was born, raised, and resides in Bovensmilde, Drenthe, Netherlands.

Major results
Sources:

2008
 5th Ronde van Midden-Nederland
2009
 4th Ronde van Midden-Nederland
 6th Omloop der Kempen
2011
 1st Stage 2 Tour de Beauce
 10th Mumbai Cyclothon I
2015
 5th Overall Tour of Estonia
2016
 4th Tour of Yancheng Coastal Wetlands

References

External links

Cycling Base: Martijn Verschoor
Cycling Quotient: Martijn Verschoor

Team Novo Nordisk: Martijn Verschoor

1985 births
Living people
Dutch male cyclists
People from Midden-Drenthe
Cyclists from Drenthe
20th-century Dutch people
21st-century Dutch people